My Way is the sixth solo album by British artist Ian Brown.  The album was released on 28 September 2009. The album's lead single "Stellify" was released on 21 September 2009. In an interview with XFM Manchester he claimed that the song was originally written for Rihanna, but he realised he had created "a great sound" so claimed the track for himself.

The second single "Just Like You" was released on 30 November 2009. This was Brown's final album for a decade, until his comeback with his 2019 album, Ripples.

Recording 
My Way was inspired by Michael Jackson's Thriller with Brown noting that "we mastered it on the day that Michael Jackson died (too), so I'm taking that as a good omen."

Track listing 
 "Stellify" – 4:57
 "Crowning of the Poor" – 3:18
 "Just Like You" – 3:22
 "In The Year 2525" (Zager and Evans cover) – 2:52
 "Always Remember Me" – 4:49
 "Vanity Kills" – 3:34
 "For The Glory" – 3:11
 "Marathon Man" – 3:39
 "Own Brain" – 2:56
 "Laugh Now" – 3:53
 "By All Means Necessary" – 3:42
 "So High" – 2:54

References 

2009 albums
Ian Brown albums